The following page lists all power stations in Poland.

Coal

Gas Turbines

Hydroelectric

Pumped Storage Hydroelectric

Wind

See also 

 List of power stations in Europe
 List of largest power stations in the world

References

Poland
 
Power stations